Ridgmont railway station is a small unstaffed railway station that serves the village of Ridgmont in Bedfordshire. It also serves the large Amazon warehouse next door.

It is on the Bletchley — Bedford Marston Vale Line.

Trains
The station is served by London Northwestern Railway Bletchley — Bedford local services. Services are operated using Class 230 multiple units. Although not geographically the midpoint of the line, many train services 'cross' at Ridgmont station. There is no Sunday passenger service timetabled although the line remains open with signalers on duty at the Marston Vale Signalling Centre at Ridgmont.

Future
It is planned that the Marston Vale line will be upgraded as part of the East West Rail programme, to permit  running. The Oxford-Bedford services are planned to stop here.

Former station house
The former station house, built in 1846 in the Cottage Orné architectural style, underwent a total refurbishment in 2014 managed by the Bedfordshire Rural Communities Charity (BRCC) with funding from the Railway Heritage Trust. A tea room, gift shop, disabled access and toilets, additional car parking, three small 'start-up' offices and a meeting room have been provided. The former Victorian booking office has been restored as a small heritage centre.

Scenes from the feature film 'One Day' were filmed at the station.

General information
Ridgmont is in sight of Junction 13 of the M1 motorway and the station is adjacent to a number of distribution centres.

It was at Ridgmont that a new Marston Vale signalling control centre was built as part of the Bedford — Bletchley route modernisation in 2004. This centre replaced all the signal boxes and block posts (some contained within station buildings including Ridgmont) on the route.

Services
An hourly service operates in each direction, Mondays to Saturdays.

Community Rail Partnership
Ridgmont station, in common with others on the Marston Vale Line, is covered by the Marston Vale Community Rail Partnership, which aims to increase use of the line by involving local people.

References

External links

Railway stations in Bedfordshire
DfT Category F2 stations
Grade II listed buildings in Bedfordshire
Former London and North Western Railway stations
Railway stations in Great Britain opened in 1846
Railway stations served by West Midlands Trains
1846 establishments in England
Grade II listed railway stations
East West Rail